Orval Roy Tessier (June 30, 1933 – August 25, 2022) was a Canadian professional ice hockey centre and coach who played parts of three seasons in the National Hockey League for the Montreal Canadiens and Boston Bruins between 1954 and 1960, appearing in a total of 59 regular season games. The rest of his career, which lasted from 1953 to 1965, was spent in the minor leagues, where he was a solid offensive player. He won two scoring titles with the Eastern Professional Hockey League's Kingston Frontenacs, and was voted the league's most valuable player and most sportsmanlike player in the 1961–62 season.

After playing, Tessier had a successful coaching career. In junior ice hockey, Tessier coached the Cornwall Royals to Memorial Cup victory in 1972. Tessier coached the 1981 Memorial Cup finalists, the Kitchener Rangers. The next season, Tessier was hired to coach the New Brunswick Hawks in the American Hockey League. He led the Hawks to a Calder Cup victory in 1982. Tessier was promoted, and named head coach of the Chicago Blackhawks, which lasted for three seasons. In 1983 Tessier won the Jack Adams Award as the best coach in the NHL.

During the 1983 Campbell Conference finals, Tessier was quoted as saying that the Blackhawks players needed "heart transplants" after giving up 16 goals in the first two games of the series against the Edmonton Oilers, and trailing in the series 2 games to 0. The quip failed to inspire the Hawks, who dropped the final two games of the series at Chicago Stadium, marking the second consecutive year Chicago lost in the Campbell Conference final.

Tessier won the Stanley Cup in 2001 with the Colorado Avalanche while serving as a scout for the team. He died on August 25, 2022 in his hometown of Cornwall, Ontario.

Career statistics

Regular season and playoffs

Coaching record

National Hockey League

American Hockey League

Junior hockey

QMJHL

OHL

Awards and achievements
1961–62 - Most valuable player & Sportsmanship award (Kingston Frontenacs)
1982–83 - Jack Adams Award (Chicago Blackhawks)

References

External links

1933 births
2022 deaths
Barrie Flyers players
Boston Bruins players
Canadian ice hockey centres
Canadian ice hockey coaches
Chicago Blackhawks coaches
Chicoutimi Saguenéens coaches
Clinton Comets players
Colorado Avalanche scouts
Cornwall Royals (OHL) coaches
Cornwall Royals (QMJHL) coaches
Hershey Bears players
Ice hockey people from Ontario
Jack Adams Award winners
Kingston Frontenacs (EPHL) players
Kitchener Greenshirts players
Kitchener Rangers coaches
Montreal Canadiens players
Montreal Royals (QSHL) players
New Brunswick Hawks
Portland Buckaroos players
Quebec Remparts coaches
Sportspeople from Cornwall, Ontario
Springfield Indians players
Stanley Cup champions
Trois-Rivières Lions (1955–1960) players